Barnabas Kelet Henagan (June 7, 1798January 10, 1855) was a physician and South Carolina politician who became the 58th Governor due to the death of Patrick Noble on April 7, 1840.

Early life and career
Henagan was born in Marlboro District on June 7, 1798, to Darby and Drusilla Henegan. He was educated at the academies in Marlboro County and he went on to study medicine at the University of Heidelberg in Germany. Afterwards he returned to South Carolina to practice medicine as a physician and he also engaged in planting. In 1826, he became the president of the Brownsville Minerva Academy.

Political career
Henagan won election to the South Carolina Senate in 1834 and was elected by the General Assembly to be the 38th Lieutenant Governor of South Carolina in 1838. In the final year of his term, Governor Patrick Noble died on April 7, 1840, and Henagan assumed the governorship. His term as governor lasted less than a year, but Henagan deplored to the Legislature the poor condition of the public schools in the state and the corruption of the electoral process. After leaving office in 1840, Henagan was reelected to the state Senate in 1844 and served as the Secretary of State from 1846 to 1850.

Later life
Henagan died on January 10, 1855, in Charleston and was buried at Rogers Cemetery in Marlboro County.

References

External links
SCIway Biography of Barnabas Kelet Henagan
NGA Biography of Barnabas Kelet Henagan
Marion County Biography of Barnabas Kelet Henagan

1798 births
1855 deaths
Heidelberg University alumni
Physicians from South Carolina
Democratic Party South Carolina state senators
Lieutenant Governors of South Carolina
Democratic Party governors of South Carolina
University of South Carolina trustees
People from Marlboro County, South Carolina
Secretaries of State of South Carolina
19th-century American politicians